Carl Christian Eduard Lange (5 December 1828 – 21 May 1900) was a Danish architect known primarily for his works on manors and churches in Jutland and several prominent buildings in Aarhus.

Biography
Carl Lange was born in Copenhagen to Christian Suhr Lange and Anne Sophie Torp. Initially he was trained as a watchmaker but the work did not interest him and he instead sought admission to the Danish Royal Danish Academy of Fine Arts which was granted in 1841. He graduated from the academy in 1849 with a degree in architecture. Not much is known about the years after graduation but in the 1860s he is first mentioned as the foreman for the architect Ferdinand Meldahl during the construction of the manor Frijsenborg.

In the period following his work at Frijsenborg, Carl Lange was commissioned as the architect  in Favrskov Municipality for the manor  Frijsendal and several farm buildings for the manor Søbygård. 
In 1869 he settled in Aarhus and quickly became a prominent architect in the city. In the 1870s he designed and built the Vester Allé Barracks, Infantry Barracks and the Garrison Hospital. He continued his work in the following decades creating Mejlen, Hotel Skandinavien, Sønder Girls School along with many residential and industry buildings. From his initial work on Frijsendal manor, Lange had established connections to the surrounding countryside and he worked on several manors and village churches throughout his life.

Lange became well respected for his works and was a member of the Craftmen's Association in Aarhus for a number of years and was a co-founded of the local Freemason chapter. He was a member of Aarhus city council from 1873 to 1878.

Works 
 The manor Frijsendal 
 Farm buildings for the manor Søbygaard
 Infantry Barracks, Aarhus (1875–79)
 Vester Allé Barracks, Aarhus (1876–77)
 Garrison Hospital, Aarhus (1877)
 Addition to the manor Vilhelmsborg (1877)
 Mejlen, Aarhus (1880s)
 Hotel Skandinavien, Aarhus 
 Sønder Girls School, Aarhus (1883–84)
 Viborg Borger School,  Viborg (1887–88)
 Wormhus, Aarhus
 Many farm buildings and estates including the manor Thomasminde
 Additions and reconstructions on several churches including churches in Kasted, Trige, Mørke and Hornslet

References

External links 

 

Danish architects
1828 births
1900 deaths
Royal Danish Academy of Fine Arts alumni